Kabali is the soundtrack album, composed by Santhosh Narayanan for the 2016 Indian Tamil-language action crime film of the same name written and directed by Pa. Ranjith and produced by Kalaipuli S. Thanu, starring Rajinikanth, Radhika Apte and Winston Chao. This album marks the first collaboration between Rajinikanth and Santhosh. The soundtrack album featuring five songs with lyrics written by Kabilan, Vivek, Umadevi and Arunraja Kamaraj was released on 12 June 2016, at Chennai and was also released in Telugu, Hindi and Malay languages. Santhosh Narayanan won the Best Music Director Award at the 2017 Ananda Vikatan Cinema Awards. Initially, he was nominated for the Best Music Director – Tamil award at the 2017 Filmfare Awards South, along with Arunraja Kamaraj, for Best Lyricist – Tamil, Best Male Playback Singer – Tamil for the song "Neruppu Da". However, Shweta Mohan won the Filmfare Award for Best Female Playback Singer – Tamil for "Maya Nadhi".

Overview 
Kabali, marks the first collaboration of Santhosh Narayanan with Rajinikanth, and also his third collaboration with Pa. Ranjith. He started composing for the film, in 2015. According to Thanu, S. P. Balasubrahmanyam, who usually sings the introduction songs of films starring Rajinikanth, was not hired for this album because he was not in the city at the time of recording.

"Ulagam Oruvanukka" is the introduction song of the film sung by Ananthu, Santhosh Narayanan, Gana Bala with lyrics written by Kabilan, Vivek and Roshan Jamrock performed the rap portions of the song. It is depicted as a rap number that exactly depicts the style of the Superstar, this one should be a visual treat. The lyrics brings out the energy that the actor carries towards the masses. The tune, though, sounds like a bit like a Rahman number.

The second song, "Maya Nadhi" by Ananthu, Pradeep Kumar, Shweta Mohan written by Umadevi is a melodious song. Sharanya CR, from The Times of India, who reviewed the album, stated that "Santhosh has kept the structure such that the singers have the opportunity to explore various expressions and sangathis. The song evokes a subtle intimacy through the lyrics and the rendition of the singers, though the keys overpower the vocals in a few places."

"Veera Thurandhara" is the third song from the film sung by Gana Bala, were Pradeep Kumar lent additional vocals and Lawrence R and Roshan Jamrock performed the rap portions of the film. The song is a westernized classic mix. Raps in the middle were catchy as well. There is an in-built silence that emphasises the lyric before the rap portion kicks in. The trumpet and percussion definitely add punch to the song.

"Vaanam Paarthaen" is a slow-paced melody number, sung by Pradeep Kumar, which is a song portraying about a lost love/lost life. This song is situational and is set to create a bigger impact when watched in theatre along with the situation.

"Neruppu Da" is an energetic number sung and written by Arunraja Kamaraj, with dialogues by Rajinikanth. The song also created goosebumps for the film. It is a high energy song to define Rajini's mass. Santhosh has put in all of his efforts to fit this song in the places of Rajini's dialogues, walk and laughs. And he successfully lived up to the immense expectations people had on Theme music. Thanks to Arun Raja's killing voice which evokes every crazy Rajini fan. Rajini's dialogues in between add more goose bumps. Tremors are to be witnessed in theatres whenever 'Nerupu da' takes charge.

"Thoondil Meen" is the bonus track of the film, sung by Pradeep, Kalyani and Dhee, which is considered to be a reprised version of "Vaanam Paarthaen".

Release 
Think Music acquired the audio rights for the Tamil version, as well as the dubbed Telugu, Hindi and Malay versions. Initially, producer S. Thanu decided to organise a grand audio launch event in Malaysia, on 30 May, where both the Tamil and Telugu versions will be released. Later, the makers decided to push the audio launch from 11 June, then to 13 June in a grand manner. However, since Rajinikanth was not in Chennai, and was holidaying in America, the makers dropped the idea of a grand launch event and composer Santhosh Narayanan announced that the songs will be released directly in all streaming platforms on 12 June 2016. The tracklist of the film was released on 9 June 2016, which features five songs.

After a 30-second audio clip was unanimously leaked through the internet, the makers released the album on Sathyam Cinemas, Chennai, on 11 June 2016, a day before the scheduled audio launch. The event was held at the presence of crew members, director Pa. Ranjith, composer Santhosh Narayanan, producer S. Thanu and Soundarya Rajinikanth in attendance, the first copy of the audio CD was handed over to Soundarya, by the crew members. The production house unveiled an official app for the film at the event. The lyrical videos of the songs were released by Think Music, through their official YouTube channel on 12 June 2016. The song teaser of "Neruppu Da" was released on 16 June 2016, and went ahead with 9 million views upon its release.

The audio of the Hindi version was released on 12 June 2016, when the Tamil version was released. The audio of the Telugu version was released on 26 June 2016 at a pre-release event held in Hyderabad. After the announcement of the film's which will be dubbed in Malay, the makers released the Malay version, consisting of two songs on 1 July 2016.

Post the film's release, an unreleased track "Thoondil Meen" which was not included in the film, was launched on 24 August 2016.

Track listing

Background score 

The original background score composed by Santhosh Narayanan was released on 10 August 2016. It features nineteen original compositions used from the film. The scores were released in jukebox format through YouTube, and digitally through all streaming platforms.

Reception 
Sharanya CR, from The Times of India, reviewed it as "A perfect treat for the Superstar's fans, and Overall, Kabali feels like a Santhosh Narayanan album composed for a Rajnith film, with the Rajinikanth factor remaining in the background, albeit in a low-key manner. If you are ready for this change, you are sure to like this." Behindwoods stated that "Having Superstar as lead, one may try commercial ways of song composition. But Ranjith and Santhosh have ensured that there are no commercial compromisations. Thanks to Santhosh, for presenting 'Rajinism' in a different style. An album composed whole heartedly keeping visuals and situations in mind." India Today, stated it as "A phenomenal theme music and an intriguing soundtrack from Santhosh Narayanan." Indiaglitz rated the album 3.75 out of 5 stars, and stated "Santhosh Narayanan has scripted a new grammar for Superstar and it is going to be pretty hard for others to outdo it." Indian Express also gave favourable reviews, stating "Neruppu Da is a stand out composition, while Maya Nadhi and Vaanam Paarthen might be goldies after years pass by."

Studioflicks rated 3.75 out of 5, stating "As on marking the final verdicts for the album, one thing is so clear that all songs are bounded to screenplay as it brings different feeling in respective of tracks. Maybe, it’s an usual style by Santhosh Narayanan, but when you think it from Rajinikanth fan perspective, it is definitely a different dimension of Thalaivar. Especially, the numbers like ‘Maya Nadhi’ and ‘Vaanam Parthen’, are really heart-binding that keeps you so much addicted, while ‘Neruppu Da’ is a massive blaster of this album." Filmfare gave the album 4 out of 5 stating, "Santhosh Narayanan hasn’t let the fact that he was composing for a Rajini vehicle get to him and made a fresh, rocking album that would be well-liked by all the old and young fans of the superstar. Can’t wait now to watch the film on big screen!" BollywoodLife gave the album 4/5 stating "Santosh Narayan has come up with an album that will be remembered for a very long time, just as the movie will be when it hits the screens. What big composers like AR Rahman could not deliver for Rajinikanth in the last few years, the young Santosh Narayan has done it with a single album."

Chart performance 
The album broke several records on digital media within a week and has received rave reviews with the majority of views coming from India, Malaysia, Singapore, USA, UAE and UK. While the lyric videos received 10 million views on YouTube, the song "Neruppu Da" topped the charts of Saavn, on Top 15 Weekly Countdown, iTunes and as well as local radio channels. The audio CDs of Kabali had a record breaking sales, which was confirmed by Swaroop Reddy of Think Music in a press interaction.

The album became one of the most streamed songs of Jiosaavn. Paramdeep Singh, co-founder and Executive Chairman of Saavn said."The Kabali album is all set to enter the Top 10 streamed Tamil albums of all timeon Saavn soon. It is clearly one of the most talked about regional albums of the year thus far."

Album credits 
All songs composed by Santhosh Narayanan

Musician credits

 Guitars - Keba Jeremiah, Pradeep Kumar (Acoustic & Slide), Joseph Vijay, Jhanu Chantar (Electric)
 Flute - Vishnu Vijay 
 Bass - Naveen, Jhanu Chantar, Pradeep Kumar
 Drums - Tapass Naresh
 Additional Keys - Sat Richard 
 Trumpet - Vijay 
 Flute - Vishnu Vijay 
 Pianica - Sajan Shenoy
 Strings - Macedonian Radio Symphonic Orchestra
 Percussion Arranged and Recorded By - R. K. Sundar
 Backing Vocals - Pradeep Kumar, Sanjana Kalmanje, Vijaynarain, Sri Shyamalangan
 Chorus - Vasudevan, Senthil Das, Sam, Sunderrajan, Balaji, Murali

Sound Engineers

 Adam Wilkinson, RK Sundar, Simon Todkill (Studios 301, Sydney)
 Rahul Ramachandran (Studio M1, Macedonia)
 Vishnu Vijay (Krimson Avenue Studios, Chennai)

Production

 All songs recorded at 
 Future Tense Studios, Prism Sounds Studios, Krimson Avenue Studios (Chennai)
 Studios 301 (Sydney)
 Studio M1 (Macedonia)
 Mixed by - Santhosh Narayanan, RK Sundar 
 Mastered by - Leon Zeros, Sat Richard 
 Musicians Coordinator - Meenakshi Iyer
 Musicians Fixer - B. Velavan

References 

2016 soundtrack albums
Tamil film soundtracks
Hindi film soundtracks
Santhosh Narayanan soundtracks